Texican Badman is the 1980 release by country rock / bluegrass musician Peter Rowan. Guest musicians include Jerry Garcia (steel guitar), David Grisman (mandolin), Flaco Jimenez (accordion), and Bill Kreutzmann (drums). Four of the songs were studio recordings from 1974, and the other six were recorded live in 1979. The standout tracks are "Sweet Melinda", "Four Corners/A Vacant Sea", "Texican Badman", and "What of Alicia".

Track listing
"Sweet Melinda"  (Peter Rowan) – 3:59 (*)
"Four Corners"  (Terry Allen) – 2:45 (**)
"A Vacant Sea"  (Allen) – 2:45 (**)
"I Can't Help It (If I'm Still in Love with You)"  (Hank Williams) – 2:58 (**)
"Squeeze Box Man"  (Jordan) – 4:34 (**)
"Texican Badman"  (Allen) – 2:53 (**)
"What of Alicia"  (Allen) – 2:50 (**)
"While the Ocean Roars"  (Rowan) – 3:53 (*)
"Awake My Love"  (Rowan) – 3:31 (*)
"On The Blue Horizon"  (Rowan) – 5:54 (*)

(*) Recorded in 1974 @ The Record Plant, Sausalito, California

(**) Recorded in 1979, Live @ Armadillo World Headquarters, Austin, Texas

Personnel
Peter Rowan – acoustic guitar, electric guitar, mandola, vocals
Jerry Garcia – pedal steel guitar, electric guitar
David Grisman – mandolin
Chris Rowan – harmony vocal
Lorin Rowan – harmony vocal
John Kahn – bass
Roger Mason – bass
Bill Kreutzmann – drums
Issac Garcia – drums
Hugo Gonzalez – bass, bajo sexto
Flaco Jiménez– accordion
Jimmy Fuller – steel guitar
Jack Bonus – saxophone

Production
Producer: Peter Rowan/Franco Ratti
Recording Engineer: Billy Wolf
Mixing: Lee Parvin/Billy Wolf
Mastering: Daniel Ryman
Cover Design/Artwork: Gigi Barbieri
Photography: Lisa Law

External links 
 

Peter Rowan albums
1980 albums